Brian Taylor is a medical cannabis activist and politician in British Columbia.  He and Marc Emery created the British Columbia Marijuana Party.  Brian was the first leader of the party during the 2001 provincial election.  He was a former mayor of Grand Forks in British Columbia, 1997–1999 and is now the current mayor of Grand Forks. He was once nicknamed the "marijuana mayor".  Brian was featured on a CBC documentary called Cannabiz  about the medicinal marijuana industry.  "Cannabis Health" is a journal magazine that was created by Brian Taylor.   A company created by Brian Taylor is Grand Forks Cannabis Research Institute Inc.

References

External links
Cannabis Health Journal – Official website.

1946 births
Living people
Canadian cannabis activists
British Columbia Marijuana Party politicians